Mae Sot Airport  is an international airport serving Mae Sot, a town in Tak Province in Thailand. Currently, it is connected to two domestic destinations. Nok Air started the first international commercial operation from Mae Sot to Yangon in October 2017, but service to Yangon stopped in January 2018. Wisdom Airways started with a 12-seater Cessna Grand Caravan a bi-weekly return flight to Chiang Mai International Airport from Mae Sot (Mondays and Saturdays).

A new passenger terminal opened on April 4, 2019. It will serve 1.7 million passengers / year, instead of 170,000 with the old terminal.

The expansion of Mae Sot's runway is to be complete in 2019. Thai AirAsia will add the Mae Sot destination soon after Mae Sot's runway expansion is complete and suitable for its Airbus A320 aircraft.

Airlines and destinations

References

External links

 
 

Airports in Thailand
Buildings and structures in Tak province
Airports established in 1930